Fontenoy-la-Joûte is a commune in the Meurthe-et-Moselle department in north-eastern France.

History
Fontenoy-la-Joûte has been a book town since 1996, it has about twenty book stores.

Demographics

See also
Communes of the Meurthe-et-Moselle department

References

External links

Official Web site 

Fontenoylajoute